Richard Riley (active 1910s) was an English professional footballer who played as a winger. He played three matches and scored two goals in the Football League for Burnley before moving to Scotland to join Third Lanark.

References

People from Padiham
English footballers
Association football outside forwards
Trawden Forest F.C. players
Burnley F.C. players
Third Lanark A.C. players
English Football League players
Scottish Football League players